Bianchini is a lunar impact crater that lies along the northern Jura Mountains that ring the Sinus Iridum, in the northwestern part of the near side of the Moon. It was named after Italian astronomer Francesco Bianchini. The impact of this crater near the edge of the Jura Mountains deposited some material into the Sinus Iridum floor.

The rim of this crater is not significantly worn, although there is a small crater along the inner side of the eastern rim. Within the inner wall is a somewhat irregular floor and a small cluster of ridges at the midpoint. Portions of the inner wall have slumped toward the floor along the northern edges.

Satellite craters
By convention these features are identified on lunar maps by placing the letter on the side of the crater midpoint that is closest to Bianchini.

References

External links
 

Impact craters on the Moon